This list contains studies about the Sherlock Holmes character, biographies of Arthur Conan Doyle and studies about his Holmesian work, the place of Sherlock Holmes character in detective literature, and other Holmes miscellanea.

Holmesian biographies

 Alleged – and "exhaustive" – biography of Holmes with short stories from various authors.

Holmesian books

 Editor's note: In this sociology textbook/mystery novel, students can join Sherlock Holmes and Watson as they discover a new area ripe for acrimony and intrigue: Social theory. In 1910, the most prominent social theorists in the world gather in London for a conference on the new science of sociology. Things rapidly fall apart, though, as a fight breaks out, a jewel is stolen, and famous sociologist Emile Durkheim disappears. As Sherlock Holmes and Watson investigate, it appears that social theory may not only explain actions--in this case, it may be the cause of them. So Holmes and Watson investigate social theory itself, learning directly from those creating it: W. E. B. Du Bois, Sigmund Freud, Vladimir Lenin, Beatrice Webb, Georg Simmel, Emile Durkheim, and Max Weber. The theories, lives, and passions of each sociologist are revealed as Holmes and Watson learn first-hand just how influential social theory can be.

 Editor's note: Taken from such works a "A Study in Scarlet", "The Sign of the Four", "The Hound of the Baskervilles", and The Case Book of Sherlock Holmes, 72 puzzles challenged the reader's abilities in language, math, codes, and, of course, deductive reasoning. Dr. Watson retells each story and, at the end, Holmes poses a new conundrum relating to the adventure.
. Offers entertaining digests of each tale and includes lists of characters, quotations, and unchronicled cases.

 A collection of stories from the period from 1890 to 1914 featuring many of the sleuths inspired by the success of Arthur Conan Doyle's Holmes stories.  (Includes stories by Jacque Futrelle, William Hope Hodgson, Hesketh Prichard, Arthur Reeve, and others).

 This reference book provides a source of various information on Sherlock Holmes such as the evolution of the characters in the stories and life in Victorian England.

Holmesian studies
. A recent psychoanalytic re-investigation of the case of The Hound of the Baskervilles.
 (OE 1967).
  Editor's Note: "Leslie Klinger, a leading authority on the world's most famous detective, reassembles in "The Complete Short Stories" the Arthur Conan Doyle's 56 canonical short stories in the order in which they were anthologized between 1892 and 1927, along with more than 700 period illustrations and some 2,000 footnotes in the margins, on everything from the Boer War to the rules of rugby, and how a "spirit case" worked."
 Editor' Note: The third volume collects the four Holmes novels, with another 300 period illustrations and 1,000 footnotes. 
 And subsequent editions (the last in 1995).

 Spanish studies on diverse Sherlockian subjects.

Holmesian Victoriana

 Annoted journal of James Berry, the hangman of the latter half of Queen's Victoria reign.
 Study of the Victorian historical background of Sherlock Holmes's lifetime.

 Spring Book  1950.

Arthur Conan Doyle related books

 [Analytical entry]

Other related studies
  Sherlock Holmes has appeared on screen more times than any other fictional character. This guide covers more than a century's worth of his exploits on film and television, including films of the silent era through to the Basil Rathbone movies of the 1940s; films from France, Germany, Italy, Japan, and Russia; Billy Wilder's film, The Private Life of Sherlock Holmes (1970); plus television versions of Sherlock Holmes, including one directed by Steven Spielberg

References

Sherlock Holmes lists